Training Center of the Ministry of Interior of Republika Srpska (Serbian: Центар за обуку Министарства унутрашњих послова Републике Српска, Centar za obuku Ministarstva unutrašnjih poslova Republike Srpske) is police-type barracks managed by the Ministry of Interior of the Republika Srpska. The center's main use is the training of police officers and as headquarters for police units and police administrations.  It is located near Zalužani Airfield in Zalužani, Banja Luka.

The training Center opened on April 4, 2018 during a celebration of the Day of Police, and was opened by former president of Republika Srpska Milorad Dodik, former prime-minister Željka Cvijanović and minister of interior Dragan Lukač.  The center is set in the former Zalužani Barracks.

Gallery

See also 
Zalužani
Police of Republika Srpska

References 

Republika Srpska
Police of Republika Srpska